Javed Kureishi (born 25 August 1961) is a former Pakistani cricketer and the first captain of the Pakistan U19 cricket team. He played a handful of youth Test and first-class cricket matches for Pakistan International Airlines  between 1977 and 1979.
Javed Kureishi is now a banker for Citibank. He has a wife and two children, Tanya Kureishi, and Saif Kureishi. Javed went to Sussex University and was a big part of the cricket team there.

Family
Born to father Omar Kureishi and mother Zohra Karim, Javed Kureishi comes from a line of renowned individuals in Pakistani society. 
Omar Kureishi had Javed at the age of 33 during his first marriage with Javed's respective mother, Zohra Karim. Omar was a fiercely passionate man, exercising his wit and intelligence through literary mediums such as books, newspaper articles and oratory broadcasts. Described to have written many well-read books about the social and political ramifications that the Pakistan-India separation and conflicts had thrust upon his society with controlled “exasperation and anger”, he spent much of his writing career both uncovering and revealing the truth to the public regardless of the consequences. 
Omar also spent time in aviation and advertising. As chief of Pakistan International Airlines, Omar made long-lasting positive changes to PIA's infrastructure and public relations.

Notes

External links
 
 

1961 births
Pakistani cricketers
Pakistan International Airlines cricketers
Living people
Sindh cricketers
Pakistan International Airlines B cricketers